The Kondopoga Bay (Kondopozhskaya Bay) is a bay (length 32 km, width over 8 km, max depth 78m) in the northwestern part of the  Karelian part of the Onega Lake, Russia .

The Kondopoga Bay is deeply carved in the land by glacial process. The  upper part of the bay receives about 90% of the waters of the Suna River via the Nigozersky (Kondopozhsky) Canal.  The bay also receives waste water, most of which comes from the Kondopoga paper mill.

A city of Kondopoga is by the northern tip of the bay.

The bay has numerous rock islands, the largest being Suisari.

References

Bays of Russia
Bodies of water of the Republic of Karelia